Jackson Township is one of four townships in Blackford County, Indiana. As of the 2010 census, its population was 1,354 and it contained 596 housing units. The township was named after Andrew Jackson, the Brevet Major General of the Battle of New Orleans and the seventh President of the United States.

Geography
Lake Placid is in this township. Lick Creek runs through the township.

Cities and towns
 Dunkirk (southeast edge)

Unincorporated towns
 Converse (originally called Crumley's Crossing)
 Millgrove
 Trenton (Post Office called Priam)

Major highways

Cemeteries
The township contains at least seven cemeteries: Buckles, Goghnauer, Mount Tabor, Reeves, South Trenton, Wayman and West Trenton.

Notes

References
 
 
 
 United States Census Bureau cartographic boundary files

External links

 Indiana Township Association
 United Township Association of Indiana

Townships in Blackford County, Indiana
Townships in Indiana